Jonas Erik Lind (born 6 June 1962) is a Swedish former footballer who played as midfielder or defender.

He played for IFK Norrköping and IF Sylvia, both from Norrköping. He won Allsvenskan with IFK Norrköping in 1989. He was named the best player in Östergötland in 1992. He played a total of 303 Allsvenskan games for Norrköping during his time there.

He later worked as production manager at E.ON in Norrköping.

References

1962 births
Living people
Swedish footballers
IF Sylvia players
IFK Norrköping players
Association football defenders
Allsvenskan players